The Mārahau River is a river of the Tasman Region, New Zealand.

See also
List of rivers of New Zealand

References

Rivers of the Tasman District
Rivers of New Zealand